B. Tech is a 2018 Indian Malayalam-language coming-of-age drama film co-written and directed by debutant Mridul Nair, starring Asif Ali, Arjun Ashokan, Anoop Menon, Aju Varghese, Alencier Ley Lopez, V. K. Prakash, Aparna Balamurali, and Niranjana Anoop in major roles.

B.Tech was released in Kerala on 5 May 2018 with positive critical reviews and became a theatrical success. The film completed a run of more than 100 days in Kerala theaters.

Plot
 
The film is set in Bangalore, the third-most populous city in India, and a magnet for engineering students from Kerala.

The story is about around half-dozen young men from Kerala whose lives and perceptions change as their friend, Azaad Mohammed, is killed in a terrorist attack. The group of men are led by Anand, a carefree B. Tech student, from a very affluent family.

The Karnataka State Police proclaims that the incident was a suicide attack, committed by Azaad, and tries to close the investigation. The police even arrests several Muslim members of the group. Knowing that Nizar was not an Islamic terrorist, Anand and his friends do not accept the police explanation. With the help of advocate Viswanath Iyyer, the group subsequently tries to prove the police version of the events wrong before the court.

Cast
 Asif Ali as Anand Subramaniam
 Arjun Ashokan as Azad Muhammad, Ananya's love interest
 Deepak Parambol as Nizar Ahmad
 Sreenath Bhasi as Jojo Mathew
 Saiju Kurup as Prasanth P. P.
 Shani Shaki as Abdu
 Aparna Balamurali as Priya Varma
 Niranjana Anoop as Ananya Viswanath, Anand's cousin and Azad's love interest
 Anoop Menon as Adv. Viswanath Iyyer
 Alencier Ley Lopez as Sayid Ali
 Jaffer Idukki as Lazer
 Subeesh Sudhi as Kuttan
 V. K. Prakash as Jayaram (Neighbour)
 Aju Varghese as Professor Manoj Abraham
 Jayan Cherthala as Subramanya Iyyer
 Neena Kurup as Smitha Subramanya Iyyer
 Harish Raj as Deputy Commissioner of Police Ramkumar Naik
 Sooraj Harris as DCP Naik's Assistant 1
 Vijesh as DCP Naik's Assistant 2
 Rama Srinivasan as Ananya's Grandmother
 Dinesh Prabhakar as Joseph
 Jayaprakash Kuloor as the Ustad
 Chitra Iyer as Priya's mother
 Anjali Nair as Azmiya, Azad Muhammad's Sister
 Arshiya Gupta as Ummukulsu,  Azad Muhammed's sister
 Krishnamoorthy as Principal Sundar Reddy
 YV Rajesh As Advocate Rama Moorthi
 Manobala as Mano
 Swaminathan as Doctor France
 Arjun R Ambat as Priya's brother
 Ann Saleem
 Sandeep Menon as Sandeep Issac
 Mridhul Nair as a cameo appearance
 Renji Panicker as Judge's Voice

Production
B. Tech is the feature directorial debut of advertisement filmmaker Mridul Nair. Produced by Maqtro Pictures, after their successful movies like C/o Sairabanu & Sunday Holiday According to Nair, the film is inspired by several real incidents and the story has been in his mind since eight years. The film was extensively shot in Bangalore.

Music

All music was composed, arranged and produced by Rahul Raj. Several critics hailed the music as a major highlight of the film.

An album containing the background score for the film was released separately by Maqtro in 2021. It contains instrumental pieces composed by Rahul Raj.

Reception

Malayalam daily Malayala Manorama appreciated the film for its good mixture of college campus life and sensitive contemporary issues, while also praising Rahul Raj's music. The Times of India praised the film giving it a 3/5 rating, praising the music, while criticizing some comedy scenes "which seemed forced in". Mathrubhumi gave a mixed review with a rating of 2.5/5, but dubbed the work of Mahesh Narayanan and Abhilash Balachandran in editing, and the music by Rahul Raj as "major plus points".

References

External links
 

2018 films
2010s Malayalam-language films
2010s coming-of-age drama films
Indian thriller drama films
Buddy drama films
Films about terrorism in India
Films scored by Rahul Raj
Films shot in Bangalore
Indian coming-of-age drama films
Law enforcement in fiction
Indian police films
Fictional portrayals of police departments in India
Fictional portrayals of the Karnataka Police
2018 drama films